Walter Mills VC (21 July 1894 – 11 December 1917) was an English recipient of the Victoria Cross, the highest and most prestigious award for gallantry in the face of the enemy that can be awarded to British and Commonwealth forces.

Details
Mills was 23 years old and a private in C Company, the 1/10th Battalion, Manchester Regiment, in the British Army when the following events occurred.

On 11 December 1917, during the First World War while Private Mills was manning a position at Red Dragon Crater near Givenchy, France, the enemy launched an intense gas attack followed by a ground assault against the overcome garrisons. Private Mills, though badly gassed himself, met the attack single-handedly and continued to throw bombs until the arrival of reinforcements. He remained at his post until the attackers had been driven off. While being carried away from the scene of battle he died of gas poisoning. However, it was due to his efforts that the enemy was defeated and the line remained intact. For this reason he was awarded the Victoria Cross.

Mills was buried at Gorre British & Indian Cemetery, Nr Bethune, Pas-De-Calais, France.

His VC Medal was buried with his daughter Ellen, who died in 1934. On 11 December 2017 a commemorative plaque was laid at Oldham parish church in memory of Walter Mills.

References

1894 births
1917 deaths
People from Oldham
British World War I recipients of the Victoria Cross
Manchester Regiment soldiers
British Army personnel of World War I
British military personnel killed in World War I
British Army recipients of the Victoria Cross
Military personnel from Lancashire